Everett Whittingham (born 25 February 1954) is a Jamaican cricketer. He played in one first-class and three List A matches for the Jamaican cricket team from 1980 to 1985.

See also
 List of Jamaican representative cricketers

References

External links
 

1954 births
Living people
Jamaican cricketers
Jamaica cricketers
Sportspeople from Kingston, Jamaica